Francesco Comande (16th century) was an Italian painter of a Renaissance style, born and active in Messina, Sicily.

He was a pupil of Deodato Guinaccia. His brother Simone Comande, born in 1588, was also a painter, and collaborated with his brother. Their styles differed with Simone having a style more influenced by the Venetian school. Simone painted a Martyrdom of St Bartholemew in Messina, and an Adoration of the Magi for the monastery of Basicò.

Sources

Painters from Messina
16th-century Italian painters
Italian male painters
Renaissance painters